Hills Creek Reservoir, also known as Hills Creek Lake, is an artificial impoundment behind Hills Creek Dam on the Middle Fork Willamette River in the U.S. state of Oregon. The reservoir and its watershed lie within the Willamette National Forest.

The U.S. Army Corps of Engineers created the lake in 1961 when it built the dam, primarily to control floods and generate hydroelectricity. Since then, the lake has become a popular recreation site with parks, boat launches, and a fishery.

Hills Creek was named for John J. Hill, who settled near the mouth of the creek in 1870. The dam and lake take their names from the creek.

Recreation
Hills Creek reservoir supports populations of crappie, wild coastal cutthroat trout, threatened bull trout and stocked rainbow trout, the latter of which average .  All wild trout (non-fin clipped) must be released.

The United States Forest Service manages campgrounds, picnic areas, and hiking trails near the lake. These include the Packard Creek Campground, Bingham Boat Launch, C.T. Beach Picnic Area, Larison Cove Canoe Area, and Larison Trail Area. The lake provides opportunities for swimming and waterskiing as well as fishing and boating.

See also
 List of lakes in Oregon

References

External links

Rivers of Lane County, Oregon
Reservoirs in Oregon
1961 establishments in Oregon